Johnson Lundy Arledge (March 12, 1907 – May 15, 1947) was an American film and stage actor.

Biography
He played dozens of supporting roles in the Hollywood movies of the 1930s–1940s, including the tractor driver who destroys a house in The Grapes of Wrath.

Arledge pursued engineering as a major in college, but eventually his work with a little theatre turned his interest to acting. He performed in vaudeville before taking on his first film role in 1931.

Filmography
This filmography is believed to be complete.

 King of Jazz (1930) - First Pianist at Giant Piano ('Rhapsody in Blue') / Quartet Member ('Nellie') (as Johnson Arledge)
 Young Sinners (1931) – Jimmy
 Daddy Long Legs (1931) – Jimmy McBride
 The Spider (1931) – Tommy
 Heartbreak (1931) – Jerry Sommers
 After Tomorrow (1932) – Office Worker / Wedding Rehearsal Guest (uncredited)
 Disorderly Conduct (1932) – Driver with Flat Tire (uncredited)
 Careless Lady (1932) – Hank Oldfield
 Huddle (1932) – Pidge
 Week Ends Only (1932) – Ted Lane
 Hell's Highway (1932) – Carter
 Olsen's Big Moment (1933) – Harry Smith
 Jimmy and Sally (1933) – Joe
 Coming Out Party (1934) – Party Crasher (uncredited)
 Flirtation Walk (1934) – 'Spike'
 Bachelor of Arts (1934) – Robert Neal
 Devil Dogs of the Air (1935) – Mac
 Mary Jane's Pa (1935) – Linc Overman
 Old Man Rhythm (1935) – Pinky Parker
 The Farmer Takes a Wife (1935) – Man Talking About Transcontinental Railroad (uncredited)
 Shipmates Forever (1935) – Johnny 'Coxswain' Lawrence
 We're Only Human (1935) – Johnny O'Brien
 You May Be Next (1936) – Eddie House
 Two in Revolt (1936) – John Woods
 Murder on a Bridle Path (1936) – Joey Thomas
 Don't Turn 'Em Loose (1936) – Walter Clifford
 The Big Game (1936) – Spike Adams
 Big City (1937) – Buddy
 Saturday's Heroes (1937) – Ted Calkins
 County Fair (1937) – John Hope
 Prison Nurse (1938) – Mousie
 Numbered Woman (1938)
 Campus Confessions (1938) – Freddy Fry
 You Can't Cheat an Honest Man (1939) – Phineas Whipsnade
 Twelve Crowded Hours (1939) – Red
 6,000 Enemies (1939) – Phil Donegan
 All Women Have Secrets (1939) – Joe Tucker
 Gone with the Wind (1939) – Dying Soldier (uncredited)
 The Grapes of Wrath (1940) – Davis 
 The Fighting 69th (1940) – Second Alabama Man (uncredited)
 Strange Cargo (1940) – Dufond
 It's a Date (1940) – Newcomer on Ship (uncredited)
 Ski Patrol (1940) – Dick Reynolds
 Flight Angels (1940) – Mr. Perry
 City for Conquest (1940) – Salesman
 The Flag of Humanity (1940, Short) – Jeremy
 Arizona (1940) – Southern Lieutenant (uncredited)
 Cheers for Miss Bishop (1941) – 'Snapper' MacRae
 That's My Man (1947) – Thunder's Owner (uncredited)
 I Wonder Who's Kissing Her Now (1947) – Clerk (uncredited)
 Dark Passage (1947) – Lonely Man (uncredited) (final film role)

References

External links
 
 

1906 births
1947 deaths
20th-century American male actors
American male film actors
Male actors from Texas
People from Crockett, Texas